Penicillium griseum is an anamorph species of the genus of Penicillium.

References

griseum
Fungi described in 1923